Celso Ricardo Furtado de Carvalho (January 5, 1956 – August 6, 2012), better known by his stage name Celso Blues Boy, was a Brazilian singer-songwriter and guitarist.

Biography
Carvalho was born in Rio de Janeiro in 1956. His stage name, "Blues Boy", is a homage to American singer B.B. King, one of his idols and major influences. (Celso would play alongside King in 1986, at a gig in Rio.) He began his musical career in 1970, when only 17 years old, accompanying bands and singers such as Raul Seixas, Sá & Guarabyra and Luiz Melodia. In 1976 he formed the band Legião Estrangeira, and started to perform in some bars and clubhouses of Rio.

In 1980 he formed the band Aero Blues, considered to be one of the first Brazilian blues rock bands to sing in the Portuguese language; however, he decided to follow with a solo career later on, and released his debut album, Som na Guitarra, in 1984. It is notable for containing his most well-known song, "Aumenta que Isso Aí É Rock 'n' Roll". More albums would come afterwards, as well as performances at the prestigious Montreux Jazz Festival in Switzerland and at the Circo Voador in Rio.

2011 saw the release of his ninth (and ultimately last) studio album, Por um Monte de Cerveja, which counted with the special participation of the members of Detonautas Roque Clube.

Blues Boy was living in Joinville, Santa Catarina, towards the end of his life; an inveterate smoker, he died on August 6, 2012, due to laryngeal cancer. He was cremated and his ashes were buried in Blumenau.

Blues Boy was a die-hard fan of the soccer club Vasco da Gama. In a show promoting the club's 113th anniversary in 2011, he played the club's anthem on his guitar.

Discography
 1984: Som na Guitarra
 1986: Marginal Blues
 1987: Celso Blues Boy 3
 1988: Blues Forever
 1989: Quando a Noite Cai
 1991: Ao Vivo (live album)
 1996: Indiana Blues
 1998: Nuvens Negras Choram
 1999: Vagabundo Errante
 2008: Quem Foi que Falou que Acabou o Rock n' Roll? (live DVD)
 2011: Por um Monte de Cerveja

References

External links
 
 Celso Blues Boy at Discogs

1956 births
2012 deaths
20th-century Brazilian male singers
20th-century Brazilian singers
Brazilian singer-songwriters
Brazilian male guitarists
Musicians from Rio de Janeiro (city)
Deaths from laryngeal cancer
Deaths from cancer in Santa Catarina (state)
Brazilian male singer-songwriters